Abrostola ussuriensis is a moth of the family Noctuidae. It is found in Eastern Asia, including Russia, Korea, Japan and recently also China.

The wingspan is 33–35 mm.

References

External links
Images

Plusiinae
Moths of Asia
Moths described in 1958